NBA Live 2003 is the 2003 installment of the NBA Live video games series. The cover features Jason Kidd as a member of the New Jersey Nets. The game was developed by EA Sports and released on October 8, 2002 for the PlayStation, PlayStation 2, Xbox, and GameCube consoles and November 14, 2002 for Microsoft Windows. It was the last NBA Live game to be released on the original PlayStation. The game includes a soundtrack, which is the first video game soundtrack in history to be certified Platinum by the RIAA, selling over 1,300,000 copies worldwide.

Reception

The game received "favorable" reviews on all platforms according to video game review aggregator Metacritic. In Japan, where the PlayStation 2 version was released on November 28, 2002, Famitsu gave that console version a score of 32 out of 40. NBA Live 2003 was a runner-up for GameSpots annual "Best Sports Game on PC" award, which went to Madden NFL 2003. It was also nominated for GameSpots annual "Best Traditional Sports Game on GameCube" award, but lost to NFL 2K3.

References

External links
 

2002 video games
Electronic Arts games
NBA Live
NuFX games
Windows games
PlayStation (console) games
PlayStation 2 games
Xbox games
GameCube games
Video games developed in Canada
Video games set in 2002
Video games set in 2003
Multiplayer and single-player video games

ru:NBA Live 2003